Sveinbjörn  is a masculine Icelandic given name. Notable people with the name include:

 Sveinbjörn Sveinbjörnsson (1847–1927), Icelandic composer
 Sveinbjörn Beinteinsson (1924–1993), founder of Íslenska Ásatrúarfélagið, a pagan revival movement in Iceland
 Sveinbjörn Egilsson (1791–1852), Icelandic writer and translator
 Sveinbjorn Johnson (1883–1946), Justice of the Supreme Court of North Dakota 1923–26

Icelandic masculine given names